Fatemeh Solati Nayebi, better known by her stage name Shohreh, is an Iranian singer. Since the Islamic Revolution in Iran, she has continued her music career in exile.

Biography
Shohreh Solati born on January 4, 1950 in Tehran to a well-to-do family of artists and entertainers, Shohreh developed an interest in music early on – singing at seven years of age. She later went on to study at the Tehran Conservatory of Music, where she received training in singing and the clarinet. Her first album titled Dokhtar-e-Mashreghi (Persian for "Eastern Girl") was successful, garnering some notability.  Magazines directed toward the youth of Iran in the 1970s also gave exposure to the singer.
Shortly before the Revolution in 1979, Shohreh left Iran to perform in a series of concerts in the United States and, due to restrictions imposed on entertainers by the new leadership, she was not able to return. So for the time being, she decided to settle down in New York City, where she married soon after. Since the revolution came unexpectedly, she and other exiled Iranian singers initially faced some difficulties to re-establish the community. However, after the birth of her daughter, Shohreh became more involved in her professional career.
Leaving behind New York City, Shohreh moved to Los Angeles in 1982, settling with the exiled Iranian music industry of the 1970s, who also established in that city. Working with songwriters, composers and arrangers, she produced and released several new albums. Most of these albums were nostalgic of the golden years of Iranian life just a few years before and thus appealed to a much wider audience, giving Shohreh's fame momentum. The yearning for Iran in Shohreh's music established a strong solidarity amongst the struggling Iranians who found comfort in her songs.
Her notable albums during this period include Jaan Jaan, Salam, Sedaayeh Paa and Shenidam.  Throughout the late 1980s and 1990s, Solati managed to increase her appeal by the release of newer albums, each earning commendation. In the 1980s she had many concerts with Siavash Shams and Andy Madadian.

However, it was not until the release of the album Zan (1994) that she unequivocally garnered positive reviews from critics. The themes of her songs in that album not only highlighted greater recognition of women's rights, but they also underlined the importance of women's duties.

At the turn of the millennium, Shohreh continued releasing more albums, "Ghesseh Goo", "Saayeh", "Atr", "Safar", "Pishooni", and "Havas". Her music albums produced outside of Iran have since outnumbered her numbers before the revolution.

Recent involvements
In 2008, Shohreh held a concert at Kodak Theatre to mark the release of her CD "Ashegham". After "Ashegham" Shohreh released Esrar, Maloomeh, Dooset Daram Naro, Bargard and Shabet Bekheir.

Her cooperation 
Shohreh Solati started a partnership with the American company Kiava LLC in 2022 to manage her social media. They collaborated due to successive hacking of the singer's social media.

Discography
{| border="0" cellpadding="0" cellspacing="10"
|
 1976: Dokhtar-e-Mashreghi
 1984: Telesm (with Shahram Shabpareh)
 1987: Salam
 1987: Sheytoonak
 1989: Yeki Yekdooneh (with Shahram Solati)
 1990: Mix
 1990: Marmar (with Dariush Eghbali, Ebi, and Farzin)
 1991: Gereftar
 1991: Sedaye Paa
 1992: Khatereh 7 (with Moein)
 1992: Ham Nafas
 1993: Jaan Jaan
 1993: Sekeh Tala (with Shahram Solati and Hassan)
 1993: Mehmoon (with Martik)
 1994: Panjereha (with Shahram Solati)
 1994: Zan
 1996: Joomeh Be Joomeh
 1996: Nemizaram Beri (with Shahram Solati and Hassan Sattar)
 1996: Ghesseh Goo
 1996: Love Songs 1
 1999: Aksaasho Paareh Kardam
 1999: Sayeh
 2000: Hekayat 5 (with Masoud Fardmanesh)
 2001: Atr
 2002: Safar
 2003: Pishooni
 2004: Yaram Koo? (with Faramarz Aslani and Siavash Ghomeishi)
 2005: Havas
 2008: Ashegham
|width="30%" align="right" valign="bottom"|

|}

ReferencesHavas DVD. Nava Media Co. June 2005. Shohreh's Exclusive InterviewTehran'' Magazine. Forouhar, Shohreh, or Helen: Whom Would You Pick as Best?  Issue 479.  Page 72–73.

External links
 
Shohreh Concert at Royal Albert Hall, London, 1987 (VIDEO: PERSIAN EVE)

1959 births
Living people
People from Tehran
Iranian pop singers
Singers from Tehran
Iranian women singers
Iranian film actresses
Caltex Records artists
Taraneh Records artists
Persian-language singers
Iranian women pop singers
Iranian television personalities
Iranian emigrants to the United States